Flying Serpent (Tengshe 螣蛇) is an asterism (name for a group of stars) in the constellation "Encampment" (Shixiu 室宿) in the Chinese constellation system. It is named after the mythological serpent, tengshe.

The Tengshe asterism was a group of "22 stars, occurring in the northern [part] of the "Encampment" constellation, [representing; or comprising the figure of] the Heavenly Snake, chief of the water reptiles", according to the treatise on astronomy in the Book of Jin (Jin Shu).

The Tengshe coincides with the lizard constellation Lacerta, and the northern parts of Lacerta occupy the center of Tengshe.

References 

Chinese constellations